Nardia huerlimannii is a species of liverwort in the family Gymnomitriaceae. It is endemic to New Caledonia.  Its natural habitat is subtropical or tropical dry forests.

References

Jungermanniales
Endemic flora of New Caledonia
Vulnerable plants
Taxonomy articles created by Polbot